The XXIII Triennale di Milano will, as its name suggests be the 23rd Milan Triennial, and it will be the 19th held in Milan itself.

Planning 
Three symposia were planned to define the theme and identify a curator for this triennial.

The first took place on 4 March 2020, and was streamed live to the public.

The second symposium The Earth seen from the Moon 
It discussed current global challenges including the COVID-19 pandemic.

The third was scheduled for the 11 July and was to consider social justice and equal rights.

Approval 
The BIE have approved the fair to run from May 20 May to 20 November 2022 with a theme of Unknown Unknowns. What we don’t know we don’t know.

References

External links 
Video of first symposium (in Italian)
Video of second symposium

2022 in Italy
Tourist attractions in Milan
 23